Ventabren is a commune in the Bouches-du-Rhône department in southern France.

Location

History
The villages dates back to 920-940 AD, when Guillaume I, Count of Provence, had a castle built there.

In 1851 the village comprised 327 houses. Six years later, a railway was built.

The 393 m long Roquefavour Aqueduct, located on the territory of the commune, was built from 1842 to 1847 to convey water from the Durance to Marseille, as part of the Canal de Marseille.

Population

See also
Communes of the Bouches-du-Rhône department

References

External links
Official website

Communes of Bouches-du-Rhône
Salyes
Bouches-du-Rhône communes articles needing translation from French Wikipedia